Live in Denmark is a live EP released by Christian Rock band, Disciple. It showcases several highlights from Disciple's performance on May 13, 2016 at Denmark's annual RiverFest event.

Videos 
Disciple released 12 videos of the very same performance on their YouTube channel on May 16–17. The songs they performed in those videos are listed below:
 321 (Southern Hospitality)
 Angels & Demons (Attack)
 Dead Militia (Attack)
 Dear X, You Don't Own Me (Horseshoes & Handgrenades)
 Invisible (Horseshoes & Handgrenades)
 Lay My Burdens (Southern Hospitality)
 Radical (Attack)
 Regime Change (Scars Remain)
 Game On (Scars Remain)
 Sayonara (Vultures)
 Scars Remain (Scars Remain)
 Yesterday Is Over (Attack)

Track listing

Personnel 
 Kevin Young – lead vocals
 Josiah Prince – rhythm guitar ,backing vocals
 Andrew Stanton – lead guitar, backing vocals
 Joey West – drums

References

2016 live albums
2016 EPs
Disciple (band) albums